Carlos Menéndez Hevia (born 17 February 1987), commonly known as Carlinos, is a Spanish former footballer who played as a winger.

Club career
Born in Noreña, Asturias, Carlinos graduated from Sporting de Gijón's youth setup, and made his debut with the reserves, playing several seasons in Segunda División B and Tercera División. In summer 2010 he signed a new contract, being promoted to the main squad; initially listed for loan, he failed to join any other club and was not registered for the forthcoming campaign.

On 26 January 2011, Carlinos was loaned to Real Unión of the third division, until June. He subsequently returned to Sporting, being again assigned to the B team.

Carlinos left Sporting in June 2012 and moved abroad for the first time in his career, joining Super League Greece side Veria FC. He made his professional debut on 21 October, coming on as a substitute for Pantelis Kafes in a 3–0 away loss against Asteras Tripolis FC.

Having been rarely played, Carlinos subsequently returned to his homeland, joining fourth-tier Condal Club in September 2013. On 28 November, he signed a short-term deal at Tarxien Rainbows F.C. in Malta.

References

External links

1987 births
Living people
People from Oviedo (Asturian comarca)
Spanish footballers
Footballers from Asturias
Association football wingers
Segunda División B players
Tercera División players
Sporting de Gijón B players
Real Unión footballers
Real Avilés CF footballers
Super League Greece players
Veria F.C. players
Maltese Premier League players
Tarxien Rainbows F.C. players
Universitario de Sucre footballers
Spanish expatriate footballers
Expatriate footballers in Greece
Expatriate footballers in Malta
Expatriate footballers in Bolivia
Spanish expatriate sportspeople in Greece
Spanish expatriate sportspeople in Malta
Spanish expatriate sportspeople in Bolivia